The judiciary of Iraq is a branch of the government of Iraq that interprets and applies the laws of Iraq, to ensure equal justice under law, and provides a mechanism for dispute resolution. The judiciary is composed of the Higher Judicial Council, the Supreme Court, the Court of Cassation, the Public Prosecution Department, the Judiciary Oversight Commission, the Supreme Iraqi Criminal Tribunal, the Central Criminal Court and other courts that are regulated by law.

Higher Judicial Council

The Higher Judicial Council manages and supervises the affairs of the federal judiciary. It oversees the affairs of the various judicial committees, nominates the Chief Justice and members of the Court of Cassation, the Chief Public Prosecutor, and the Chief Justice of the Judiciary Oversight Commission, and drafts the budget of the judiciary. In 2013, the Council of Representatives passed the Iraqi Federal Court Act, which forbids the Chief Justice of the Supreme Court from also being the head of the Judicial Council, and replaced him with the Chief Justice of the Court of Cassation.

Supreme Court

The Supreme Court is an independent judicial body that interprets the constitution and determines the constitutionality of laws and regulations. It acts as a final court of appeals, settles disputes amongst or between the federal government and the regions and governorates, municipalities, and local administrations, and settles accusations directed against the President, the Prime Minister and the Ministers. It also ratifies the final results of the general elections for the Council of Representatives.

Supreme Iraqi Criminal Tribunal

The Supreme Iraqi Criminal Tribunal (formerly the Iraqi Special Tribunal) is a body established to try Iraqi nationals or residents accused of genocide, crimes against humanity, war crimes or other serious crimes committed between 1968 and 2003. It organized the trials of Saddam Hussein, Ali Hassan al-Majid ("Chemical Ali"), former Vice President Taha Yassin Ramadan, former deputy Prime Minister Tariq Aziz and other former senior officials of the deposed Ba'athist regime. The Court was set up by the Coalition Provisional Authority and reaffirmed later by the Iraqi Interim Government. In 2005 it was renamed after the constitution banned "special or exceptional courts". The Transitional Administrative Law (TAL) promulgated by the Iraq Governing Council before the restoration of Iraqi sovereignty preserves and continues the Iraq Special Tribunal in force and effect.

Central Criminal Court

The Central Criminal Court is the main criminal court of Iraq. The CCCI is based on an inquisitorial system and consists of two chambers: an investigative court, and a criminal court.

References

External links
 The Iraqi Higher Judicial Council

 
Government of Iraq
Law of Iraq